Byrsinus is a genus of burrowing bugs in the tribe Geotomini, erected by Franz Xaver Fieber in 1860.  
The species Byrsinus flavicornis is recorded from northern Europe including the British Isles.

Species 
According to BioLib the following are included:
 Byrsinus albipennis (A. Costa, 1853)
 Byrsinus australis Lis, 2001
 Byrsinus azrak Linnavuori, 1993
 Byrsinus balcanicus (Josifov, 1986)
 Byrsinus brevicornis Wagner, 1964
 Byrsinus comaroffii (Jakovlev, 1879)
 Byrsinus cristatus (Jeannel, 1914)
 Byrsinus discus Jakovlev, 1906
 Byrsinus flavicornis (Fabricius, 1794)
 Byrsinus fossor (Mulsant & Rey, 1866)
 Byrsinus laeviceps (Kerzhner, 1972)
 Byrsinus laticollis (Wagner, 1954)
 Byrsinus minor Wagner, 1964
 Byrsinus multitrichus Lis, 2001
 Byrsinus nigroscutellatus (Montandon, 1900)
 Byrsinus ochraceus (Distant, 1899)
 Byrsinus pallidus (Puton, 1887)
 Byrsinus pauculus (Signoret, 1882)
 Byrsinus penicillatus Wagner, 1964
 Byrsinus pevtzovi Jakovlev, 1903
 Byrsinus pilosulus (Klug, 1845)
 Byrsinus pseudosyriacus Linnavuori, 1977
 Byrsinus rugosus (Jakovlev, 1874)
 Byrsinus setosus Lis, 2001
 Byrsinus syriacus (Horváth, 1917)
 Byrsinus varians (Fabricius, 1803)

See also
 List of heteropteran bugs recorded in Britain

References

External links
 

Pentatomomorpha genera
Hemiptera of Europe
Cydnidae